Biloxi is a city in and one of two county seats of Harrison County, Mississippi, United States (the other being the adjacent city of Gulfport). The 2010 United States Census recorded the population as 44,054 and in 2019 the estimated population was 46,212. The area's first European settlers were French colonists.

The city is part of the Gulfport–Biloxi metropolitan area and the Gulfport–Biloxi–Pascagoula, MS Combined Statistical Area. Prior to Hurricane Katrina, Biloxi was the third-largest city in Mississippi, behind Jackson and Gulfport. Due to the widespread destruction and flooding, many refugees left the city. Post-Katrina, the population of Biloxi decreased, and it became the fifth-largest city in the state, being surpassed by Hattiesburg and Southaven.

The beachfront of Biloxi lies directly on the Mississippi Sound, with barrier islands scattered off the coast and into the Gulf of Mexico. Keesler Air Force Base lies within the city and is home to the 81st Training Wing and the 403d Wing of the U.S. Air Force Reserve.

History

Colonial era

In 1699 French colonists formed the first, permanent, European settlement in French Louisiana, at Fort Maurepas, now in Ocean Springs, Mississippi, and referred to as "Old Biloxi". They were under the direction of Pierre Le Moyne d'Iberville. La Louisiane was separated from Spanish Florida at the Perdido River near Pensacola (this was founded by the Spanish 1559 and again in 1698).

The name of Biloxi in French was Bilocci, a transliteration of the term for the local Native American tribe in their language.  Labeled along with "Fort Maurepas" on maps dated circa year 1710/1725, the name was sometimes used in English as "Fort Bilocci".

In 1720, the area of today's city of Biloxi was settled for the first time around Fort Louis. In this year the administrative capital of French Louisiana was moved to Biloxi (or Bilocci) from Mobile (or La Mobile). French Louisiana, part of New France, was known in French as La Louisiane in colonial times. In modern times it is called La Louisiane française to distinguish it from the modern state of Louisiana.

Due to fears of tides and hurricanes, colonial governor Bienville moved the capital of French Louisiana in 1722 from Biloxi to a new inland harbor town named La Nouvelle-Orléans (New Orleans), built for this purpose in 1718–1720.

In 1763, following Britain's victory in the Seven Years' War/French and Indian War, France had to cede their colonies east of the Mississippi River, except for New Orleans, to Great Britain, as part of the Treaty of Paris. At the same time, the French colony west of the Mississippi, plus New Orleans, was ceded to Spain as part of the Treaty of Fontainebleau.

Subsequent history

British rule lasted from 1763 to 1779, followed by Spanish rule from 1779 to 1810. Despite this, the character of Biloxi remained mostly French, as their descendants made up the majority of the population. In 1811, the US traded with Spain to take over Biloxi and related area, making it part of their Mississippi Territory. Mississippi, and Biloxi with it, was admitted as a state to the union in 1817.

Biloxi began to grow. In the antebellum period of the 19th century, it became known as a summer resort, because of its proximity to the breezes and beaches of the coast. It also had the advantages of proximity to New Orleans and ease of access via water. Summer homes were built by wealthy slave-owners and commercial figures. Hotels and rental cottages were developed to serve those who could not afford their own homes.

The Biloxi Lighthouse was built in Baltimore, Maryland, and shipped south, where it was completed at the site in May 1848. (It is one of two surviving lighthouses on the Mississippi Gulf Coast, which at one time had twelve.)

In the early stages of the Civil War, Ship Island was captured by Union forces, enabling them to take control of Biloxi. No major battles were fought in the area, and Biloxi did not suffer direct damage from the war. Some local Union sentiment could be discerned following the war's conclusion.

In the postbellum period, Biloxi again emerged as a vacation spot. Its popularity as a destination increased with railroad access. In 1881, the first cannery was built in the town to process seafood, leading to others soon joining the location. This stimulated development in the city, and it attracted new immigrants from Europe and different ethnic groups who worked in the seafood factories. They processed shrimp and other local seafood. These changes gave Biloxi a more heterogeneous population.

During World War II, the United States Army Air Forces built Keesler Field, now Keesler Air Force Base, which became a major basic training site and site for aircraft maintenance. The Biloxi economy boomed as a result, attracting new residents and businesses. By 1958, the first Jewish synagogue had been built in the town.

Biloxi's casino history dates to a period in the 1940s. At the time, open, if technically illegal, gambling took place in a casino within the Broadwater Beach Resort. Open gambling ended during the 1950s. The Mississippi Gulf Coast became known as the "Poor Man's Riviera", and was frequented by Southern families interested in fishing expeditions during the summer. Commercially, Biloxi was dominated by shrimp boats and oyster luggers.

In 1959 Biloxi was the site of "Mississippi's first public assault on racial barriers in its 15-year civil rights struggle". Gilbert R. Mason, a black physician in Biloxi, went swimming at a local beach with seven black friends. They were ordered to leave by a city policeman, who told them that "Negroes don't come to the sand beach." Mason reacted by leading a series of protests, known as the Biloxi Wade-Ins. The protests were followed in 1960 by the worst racial riot in Mississippi history, during which ten people died. Ultimately, the protests led to the desegregation of the beaches of Biloxi.

In the early 1960s, the Gulf Coast again emerged as a prime alternative to Florida as a southern vacation destination among Northerners, with Biloxi a favored destination. Biloxi hotels upgraded their amenities and hired chefs from France and Switzerland in an effort to provide some of the best seafood cuisine in the country. Edgewater Mall was built in 1963.

With the introduction of legal gambling in Mississippi in the 1990s, Biloxi was again transformed. It became an important center in the resort casino industry. The new hotels and gambling complexes brought millions of dollars in tourism revenue to the city. The more famous casino complexes were the Beau Rivage casino resort, the Hard Rock Hotel and Casino, Casino Magic, Grand Casino, Isle of Capri Casino Resort Biloxi, Boomtown Casino, President Casino Broadwater Resort, and Imperial Palace. Like Tunica County in the northern part of the state, Biloxi and the surrounding Gulf Coast region were considered a leading gambling center in the Southern United States.

To celebrate the area's tricentennial in 1998/99, the city's tourism promotion agency invited the nationally syndicated Travel World Radio Show to broadcast live from Biloxi, with co-host Willem Bagchus in attendance.

By the early 21st century, Biloxi's economy was based on the seafood industry, tourism, and gaming.

Hurricanes
Scores of hurricanes have hit the Mississippi Gulf Coast, but the most destructive, as measured by storm surge levels in the Biloxi Lighthouse, occurred in 1855, 1906, 1909, 1947, 1969 (Hurricane Camille), and 2005 (Hurricane Katrina)

Hurricane Katrina
On August 29, 2005, Hurricane Katrina hit the Mississippi Gulf Coast with high winds, heavy rains and a  storm surge, causing massive damage to the area. Katrina came ashore during the high tide of 6:56am, +2.3 feet more. Commenting on the power of the storm and the damage, Mayor A. J. Holloway said, "This is our tsunami." Mississippi Governor Haley Barbour was quoted as saying the destruction of the Mississippi coastline by Hurricane Katrina looked like an American Hiroshima.

On the morning of August 31, 2005, in an interview on MSNBC, Governor Barbour stated that 90% of the buildings along the coast in Biloxi and neighboring Gulfport had been destroyed by the hurricane. Several of the "floating" casinos were torn off their supports and thrown inland, contributing to the damage.

Many churches were destroyed or severely damaged, including St. Michael's Catholic Church, which was gutted by the storm surge, breaking the entry doors and stained-glass windows along the first floor; however, the interior was later removed, and the structure was still solid enough to allow repairing the church.

Hurricane Katrina damaged over 40 Mississippi libraries beyond repair, breaking windows and flooding several feet in the Biloxi Public Library, requiring a total rebuild.

Hurricane-force winds persisted for 17 hours and tore the branches off many coastal oak trees, but the tree trunks survived the  flood and many have since regrown smaller branches. Some reconstructed homes still have their antebellum appearance, and miles inland, with less flooding, shopping centers have reopened.

Harrison County Coroner Gary T. Hargrove told the mayor and City Council that Hurricane Katrina had claimed 53 victims in Biloxi, as of January 30, 2006. Of the 53 confirmed fatalities in Biloxi, a figure that includes one unidentified male, Hargrove said the average age was 58, with the youngest being 22 and the oldest 90; 14 were female and 39 were male.

Biloxi is the site of a well-known memorial to Katrina victims. The memorial was created by a team of local artists (Elizabeth Veglia and Aaron Kramer), an architect (Dennis Cowart), a contractor (Roy Anderson Corporation), and city liaison (Nathan Sullivan), with assistance from the crew and volunteers of Extreme Makeover: Home Edition.

Many casinos were damaged or destroyed by Hurricane Katrina. Of the casinos that were located in Biloxi, eight have reopened since Katrina. They are the Grand Biloxi Casino Hotel Spa (formerly known as Grand Casino Biloxi), the Hard Rock Hotel & Casino, the Golden Nugget, the Palace Casino Resort, the IP Casino Resort Spa (formerly known as Imperial Palace), Treasure Bay Casino, Boomtown Casino, and the Beau Rivage, which reopened on the first anniversary of Hurricane Katrina.

Multiple plans have been laid out to rebuild the waterfront areas of Biloxi, and the federal government has recently announced that it is considering giving up to 17,000 Mississippi coast homeowners the option to sell their properties so that a vast hurricane-protection zone can be implemented. Meanwhile, the city of Biloxi is rapidly implementing plans to allow the redevelopment of commercial properties south of Highway 90.

Geography and climate
Biloxi is located in southeastern Harrison County, bordered to the south by Mississippi Sound (part of the Gulf of Mexico) and to the northeast partially by Biloxi Bay, which forms part of the Jackson County line. To the northeast, across Biloxi Bay, are the Jackson County city of Ocean Springs and the unincorporated community of St. Martin. The Back Bay of Biloxi continues west from the Jackson County line, crossing the city of Biloxi to Big Lake on the city's western boundary, where the Biloxi and Tchoutacabouffa rivers join. The Tchoutacbouffa flows from east to west across the city and forms part of the city's eastern boundary. Biloxi is bordered to the north and east by the city of D'Iberville and to the west by the city of Gulfport.

Biloxi has a humid subtropical climate (Köppen: Cfa) that is heavily influenced by the Gulf of Mexico. Winter days are mild and wet. Snow is extremely rare in Biloxi. Summers are hot and humid, bearing the brunt of tropical storms during the late summer to fall.

Demographics

Biloxi is the smaller of two principal cities of the Gulfport-Biloxi, Mississippi Metropolitan Statistical Area, which is included in the Gulport-Biloxi-Pascagoula Combined Statistical Area.

2020 census

As of the 2020 United States census, there were 49,449 people, 17,923 households, and 10,922 families residing in the city.

2000 census
As of the census of 2000, there were 50,644 people, 19,588 households, and 12,379 families residing in the city. The population density was 1,331.8 per square mile (514.2/km). There were 22,115 housing units at an average density of 581.6 per square mile (224.5/km). The racial makeup of the city was 71.43% White, 19.04% African American, 0.49% Native American, 5.11% Asian, 0.11% Pacific Islander, 1.43% from other races, and 2.38% from two or more races. 3.65% of the population were Hispanic or Latino of any race.

There were 19,588 households, out of which 31.4% had children under the age of 18 living with them, 44.6% were married couples living together, 14.0% had a female householder with no husband present, and 36.8% were non-families. 30.1% of all households were made up of individuals, and 10.6% had someone living alone who was 65 years of age or older. The average household size was 2.42 and the average family size was 3.02.

In the city, the population dispersal was 24.2% under the age of 18, 14.3% from 18 to 24, 30.3% from 25 to 44, 19.2% from 45 to 64, and 12.0% who were 65 years of age or older. The median age was 32 years. For every 100 females, there were 101.9 males. For every 100 females age 18 and over, there were 101.6 males. The median income for a household in the city was $34,106, and the median income for a family was $40,685. Males had a median income of $28,046 versus $21,267 for females. The per capita income for the city was $17,809. 14.6% of the population and 11.2% of families lived below the poverty line. Out of the total population, 19.6% of those under the age of 18 and 11.7% of those 65 and older were living below the poverty line.

In 2005, as a result of Hurricane Katrina, many Vietnamese Americans left Biloxi. In 2009 members of the Vietnamese community in Biloxi said that Vietnamese were coming back to Biloxi due to a poor economic scenario in other parts of the United States.

Economy

Casinos
Biloxi is home to eight casino resort hotels, with 24-hour gambling, concert entertainment shows, and several restaurants. Some of the current casino resorts include (dates reflect business status after Hurricane Katrina):

 Beau Rivage Resort & Casino (Reopened August 29, 2006, on the first anniversary of Hurricane Katrina). 
 Golden Nugget Biloxi 
 Hard Rock Hotel & Casino (Opened June 2007)
 Harrah's Gulf Coast
 IP Casino Resort & Spa (Reopened December 22, 2005)
 Palace Casino Resort
 Boomtown Casino (Reopened 2006)
 Treasure Bay Casino

Arts and culture
 2010 saw the grand opening of the new Frank Gehry designed Ohr-O'Keefe Museum Of Art. 
 Biloxi is the setting of Neil Simon's play and film Biloxi Blues, which starred Mathew Broderick. Biloxi Blues is the story of army recruits during World War II training at Keesler Field, the present-day Keesler Air Force Base.
 Biloxi is the setting of several John Grisham novels, including The Runaway Jury, The Partner, and The Boys from Biloxi  (2022).
 A substantial portion of Larry Brown's novel Fay is set in Biloxi.
 American singer-songwriter Jesse Winchester wrote and recorded a song called "Biloxi", for which he was inspired by a few images he saw of the city. The song was recorded by country rock singer Iain Matthews for his 1974 album Some Days You Eat the Bear.
 On his largest-selling regular album, Changes in Latitudes, Changes in Attitudes (1977), Jimmy Buffett included a cover of "Biloxi" (see above); also, a compilation album of his digitally remastered greatest hits was released in 1995 called Biloxi.
 The song "Louisiana", by The Loved Ones, is about the rebuilding of the hurricane ravaged areas on the Gulf Coast. Louisiana, Biloxi, and Alabama are specifically used by name.
 From 1990 to 1994, Biloxi served as home to the Miss Teen USA Pageant.
 American journalist and novelist Joan Didion mentions Biloxi and the Edgewater Plaza mall in her collection of essays, The White Album.

Sports

In the center of what fisheries biologists term "The Fertile Fisheries Crescent", Biloxi offers some of the finest sportsfishing along the entire northern coast of the Gulf of Mexico. Spotted seatrout, red drum, Spanish and king mackerel, flounder, snapper, grouper, sharks, and more are all available to anglers during the fishing season. It is not known how Hurricane Katrina affected this ecosystem.

The Biloxi Shuckers, the Class AA Southern League affiliate of the Milwaukee Brewers play in MGM Park.

Biloxi was the host city of the 2009 Women's World Military Cup.

Biloxi City Futbol Club is set to join the Louisiana Premier League for the fall of 2016.

Government

The Bolton State Office Building in Biloxi includes the headquarters of the Mississippi Department of Marine Resources and the South Regional Office of the Mississippi Department of Environmental Quality.

The United States Postal Service operates the Biloxi Post Office and other area post offices.

Fire department

The Biloxi Fire Department will have 10 Stations in both 2018 and 2019. As of right now, Station 7 is operated by 4 firefighters in a trailer in Woolmarket. Station 7 will be on the property of the dispatch center and the maintenance facilities, right by the road. It will be a 3-bay Fire Station in the design of a beach house. Station 10 is being built on Old Highway 67 and will look similar to Stations 2 and 9.

Education
The city is served by the Biloxi Public School District and the Harrison County School District.

The Gulf Coast has a large Catholic school system, 15 of which are in Biloxi.

Media

Newspaper
Biloxi has one daily newspaper, the Sun Herald, which is headquartered in nearby Gulfport.

Television
According to Nielsen Media Research, the Biloxi market, as of the 2015–2016 season, is the third largest of five television markets in Mississippi, and the 158th largest in the country. Three major television stations serve the Biloxi area. ABC affiliate WLOX 13 and PBS/MPB member station WMAH-TV 19 are located in Biloxi, while Fox/MyNetworkTV affiliate WXXV-TV 25 is located in Gulfport. In addition to the stations' main programming, WLOX and WXXV-TV broadcast programming from other networks on digital subchannels. WLOX-DT2 serves as the market's CBS affiliate, while WXXV-TV operates the market's respective NBC and CW affiliates on DT2 and DT3.

Radio

20 FM and 7 AM radio stations operate in and/or serve the Biloxi area.

Infrastructure

Transportation
Biloxi is served by the Gulfport-Biloxi International Airport in Gulfport.

Biloxi's main highway is U.S. Highway 90 (Beach Boulevard), which runs along the beach and by the casinos. It connects the city to Gulfport and points westward and to Ocean Springs and Pascagoula to the east. The Biloxi Bay Bridge, connecting Biloxi and Ocean Springs, was rebuilt after Hurricane Katrina, and was fully reopened in April 2008.

Interstate 10 passes through the northern sections of the city, leading west  to New Orleans and east  to Mobile, Alabama. Interstate 110 splits off from I-10 at D'Iberville and heads south across the Back Bay of Biloxi to U.S. 90 near Beau Rivage, providing the city with an important hurricane evacuation route.

North–south highways serving the area include:
 Mississippi Highway 15 (runs concurrently with I-110 for the first few miles)
 Mississippi Highway 67

Notable people
Jessica Alba, model and actress, lived in Biloxi while her father was stationed at Keesler Air Force Base
 Lionel Antoine, Chicago Bears third overall pick in 1972 NFL Draft
 Laura Bailey, voice actress
Casey Eure, American politician, elected into the Mississippi House of Representatives
 Matt Barlow, heavy metal singer
 Alan Belcher, MMA fighter with UFC
 Belladonna, retired pornographic actress, director, producer, and model
 Jimmy Bertrand, jazz drummer
 Malcolm Brown, NFL running back for Miami Dolphins
 Hector Camacho, world champion boxer
 Isaiah Canaan, point guard, Philadelphia 76ers
 Chris Carson, NFL running back for Seattle Seahawks
 Gary Collins, actor and television personality
 Jefferson Davis, U.S. Army general and West Point graduate; U.S. Secretary of War (Defense); only president of Confederate States of America
 Gwen Dickey, singer best known as the front-woman of the R&B band Rose Royce
 Ronald Dupree, professional basketball player
 Leonard Fairley, football player
 Damion Fletcher, University of Southern Mississippi running back
 Jeff Gann, professional wrestler known as "The Gambler"
 Fred Haise, Apollo 13 and Space Shuttle Enterprise astronaut
 Ted Hawkins, singer-songwriter
 Michael Janus, Mississippi state legislator
 Tim Jones (American football), wide receiver NFL player for Jacksonville Jaguars
 Chris LeDoux, country singer
 Barry Lyons, catcher for New York Mets
 James Millhollin, character actor, died in Biloxi in 1993
 Mark Miloscia, former Washington State Senator
 Mary Ann Mobley, actress and Miss America
 Russell D. Moore, President of the Ethics & Religious Liberty Commission (ERLC)
 Francis D. Moran, third director of NOAA Commissioned Officer Corps
 Jack Nelson, Pulitzer Prize-winning journalist who began career at Biloxi Daily Herald
 George E. Ohr, groundbreaking potter and father of American Abstract-Expressionism movement
 Mathieu Olivier, ice hockey player
 Chuck Pfarrer, former Navy SEAL, Hollywood screenwriter, New York Times best selling author, novelist
 Eric Roberts, Oscar-nominated actor
 Wes Shivers, NFL player for Tennessee Titans and mixed martial artist
 John Kennedy Toole, author of A Confederacy of Dunces, committed suicide in Biloxi in 1969
 Brenda Venus, model and actress

Filming location
Several films have been produced in Biloxi, including:

Mississippi Masala, 1992 film starring Denzel Washington.
Arsenal, 2017 film starring Adrian Grenier, John Cusack, and Nicolas Cage.
Vanquish, 2021 film starring Morgan Freeman and Ruby Rose.

See also

Dixie Mafia
Pete Halat
Historic Grand Hotels on the Mississippi Gulf Coast
List of mayors of Biloxi, Mississippi
List of tallest buildings in Biloxi
National Register of Historic Places listings in Harrison County, Mississippi
Old Brick House (Biloxi, Mississippi)
Pleasant Reed House
Tivoli Hotel (Biloxi, Mississippi)
Tullis-Toledano Manor
United States Post Office, Courthouse, and Customhouse (Biloxi, Mississippi)
USS Biloxi

References

External links

 
 Photographs and Video of Hurricane Katrina's Aftermath from photosfromkatrina.com
 

 
Populated places established in 1720
Cities in Mississippi
Cities in Harrison County, Mississippi
Gambling in Mississippi
Former colonial and territorial capitals in the United States
County seats in Mississippi
Gulfport–Biloxi metropolitan area
French-American culture in Mississippi
Populated coastal places in Mississippi
1720 establishments in the French colonial empire
Mississippi placenames of Native American origin